Robert William "Bob" Edgar (May 29, 1943 – April 23, 2013) was an American politician and administrator from Pennsylvania, and a member of the Democratic Party. He served as a member of the United States House of Representatives from 1975 to 1987, representing the 7th district of Pennsylvania. He served as president and CEO of Common Cause, a nonpartisan government watchdog organization, from May 2007 until his death. Edgar died suddenly at his home on April 23, 2013, following a heart attack.

Early life and education
Edgar was born in Philadelphia, Pennsylvania, and grew up in Springfield, Pennsylvania.

He attended Lycoming College in Williamsport, Pennsylvania, where he received a Bachelor of Arts degree, and then was ordained a minister after graduating with a Master of Divinity degree from the Theological School of Drew University in Madison, New Jersey. He received a certificate in pastoral psychiatry from Hahnemann University Hospital in Philadelphia in 1969. He later served as United Protestant Chaplain of Drexel University, and as a special assistant to Congressman Bill Gray.  From 2001 until his death he was a member of the Greater New Jersey Annual Conference; he transferred from the California Pacific Conference.

Congressional career
With his 1974 election to the House of Representatives, Edgar became the first Democrat in 36 years to represent this Delaware County-based district.

Serving in the United States Congress from 1975 to 1987, Edgar sought to improve public transportation, authored the community Right to Know provisions of Super Fund legislation, and co-authored the new G.I. Bill for the all-volunteer service. Among other appointments, he served as chair of the Congressional Clearinghouse on the Future from 1982 through 1986, and as a member of the House Select Committee on Assassinations, from 1976 through 1978, that investigated the deaths of Dr. Martin Luther King Jr., and President John F. Kennedy.

Representing what was then a classic Rockefeller Republican district, Edgar was reelected five times against vigorous Republican opposition. His closest contests came in 1978, when he only survived by 1,300 votes, and in 1984, when he won by only 412 votes. The latter election came in the midst of Ronald Reagan's landslide reelection victory; Reagan won the district by over 20 points.

Edgar ran for the United States Senate in 1986, defeating Auditor General Don Bailey, a former congressman from western Pennsylvania, in the primary, but lost the general election to incumbent Republican Senator Arlen Specter by more than 12 percentage points. It is this experience that led Edgar to become frustrated with political campaigning and money in politics, even taking a somewhat sympathetic and supportive stance on clean elections and campaign finance reform, which he dictated at the 2004 Democracy Matters Conference in Albany, New York.

Claremont School of Theology
In 1990, Edgar began a ten-year term of service as President of Claremont School of Theology, Claremont, California, a graduate-professional school related to the United Methodist Church and part of the Claremont educational consortium east of Los Angeles. He is credited with bringing the school from financial distress into a stable and successful period of growth.

National Council of Churches
In 2000, Edgar began a seven-year term as chief executive of the National Council of the Churches of Christ in the USA. Under his leadership, the 50-year-old NCC began to reshape its mission, focusing its energies on major initiatives in the areas of overcoming poverty, protecting the natural environment, fostering interfaith understanding, and building international peace.  Following his retirement from the NCC, he served six years as President of Common Cause, from 2007 until his death in 2013.

Additional positions
Edgar served on the boards of several organizations, including Independent Sector, the National Coalition for Health Care, and the National Religious Partnership for the Environment. He also served on the board of directors of the Environmental and Energy Study Institute, an independent, non-profit organization that is a principal resource for Congress on environmental and energy issues.

He was an endorser of the Genocide Intervention Network.

Honors and awards
Edgar was recognized by several national organizations for his work, including by the American Legion, Vietnam Veterans of America and the National Taxpayers Union.

References

External links
with Robert William Edgar by Stephen McKiernan, Binghamton University Libraries Center for the Study of the 1960s, December 3, 2010

Robert William Edgar entry at The Political Graveyard

1943 births
2013 deaths
American Christian religious leaders
Politicians from Philadelphia
Politicians from Williamsport, Pennsylvania
People from Annandale, Virginia
Drew University alumni
Lycoming College alumni
Democratic Party members of the United States House of Representatives from Pennsylvania
20th-century American politicians
People from Burke, Virginia